Sharpless 264, also known as the Lambda Orionis Ring, is a molecular cloud and H II region, which can be seen in the northern region of the Orion molecular cloud complex (OMCC), in the constellation of Orion. The OMCC is one of the best-known star formation regions and the closest sector of the Milky Way to the Solar System where high-mass stars are born. The nebula is named after its main star, λ Orionis, a blue giant responsible for the ionization of the surrounding material. It is also sometimes called the Angelfish Nebula due to its resemblance as to its lighter areas (pink to peach colour) to an angelfish. In the infrared its ionized boundaries are that which appears, instead.

Observations

λ Orionis (also known as Meissa or Heka) at about 1,100 light-years is the star representing the head of Orion and can be found to the north of the quadrangle defined by the stars Betelgeuse, Bellatrix, Rigel and Saiph. This star can be found at the centre of open cluster Collinder 69 composed of fourth and fifth-magnitude young hot stars, visible to the naked eye.  It can be resolved with a pair of binoculars. The rest of the cluster and associated nebula spans a few hundred light-years centred about 1400 light-years away.

The broad nebula shown is not visible unaided, with binoculars or small amateur telescopes. It becomes clear in long-exposure photographs, such as in the first illustration on this page.

Orange giant φ2 Orionis, while appearing to be surrounded by the Ring, is merely a foreground object at only about 116 light years from Earth.

HD 34989 is a blue-white main sequence star, visible magnified only, just outside the Ring. It has a small nebulous cloud more geared towards the near-infrared than other parts of the neighbouring ionized regions across the Ring.

Gallery

References

External links
CCD Images of the Sharpless Catalog
Galaxy Map

Sharpless objects
H II regions
Orion molecular cloud complex
Orion (constellation)